Ali Shirazinia, commonly known by his stage name Dubfire, is an Iranian American house and techno DJ and producer. Prior to his solo career, Dubfire made up half of the duo Deep Dish. Dubfire's style is noticeably different from that of Deep Dish, consisting of techno rather than progressive house.

Biography
Dubfire was born in Iran and moved to the United States at the age of 7 with his father, mother and brother for his father to attend an American university. Growing up in the Washington, D.C., area, Dubfire spent much of his youth playing the guitar in school bands and listening to heavy doses of classic hip hop, jazz/rare groove, dub, new wave and industrial and was also influenced by the local punk scene and the music of Washington DC-based bands including Fugazi and Minor Threat. He frequented a local record store called Yesterday And Today Records, where he became acquainted with the sounds of artists like Kraftwerk, Ministry, Jesus & Mary Chain, Depeche Mode, Nitzer Ebb, Adrian Sherwood of On-U Sound and Einstürzende Neubauten.

In 1991, Shirazinia and fellow DC resident Sharam Tayebi formed Deep Dish, a DJ and production duo that became notable for their productions and DJ sets. Deep Dish released acclaimed dance classics beginning with the 1995 remix of De'Lacy's "Hideaway", and went on to work with an eclectic array of names in pop, rock and electronica. Sharam and Dubfire established Deep Dish Records, and they went on to win a Grammy in 2002 for their remix of Dido's "Thank You" along with many other high-profile awards. Following their successes as Deep Dish, both Sharam and Dubfire began to produce and DJ individually claiming "[they] got bored doing the same thing. [They've] always been separate producers and separate DJs who have just collaborated together for all these years."

Shirazinia used his long-time stage name "Dubfire" for his solo productions. His solo sound differs noticeably from that of Deep Dish, consisting of minimal, techno, and house rather than the predominantly progressive house sound of Deep Dish. His production I Feel Speed, which is a cover of an obscure Love & Rockets song, features his own vocals. Dubfire also sings in In Love With a Friend on Deep Dish's debut album. I Feel Speed has appeared in the advertisement of the Volkswagen Eos.

In 2007, Dubfire announced the launch of his new record label, Science + Technology Digital Audio, also known simply as SCI + TEC. He set the label up as an outlet to release his new music and began quietly unleashing a string of remarkable tracks. In 2007, he released electro-tech track "Roadkill," while the stripped-back 'RibCage' became the first ever release on Loco Dice's Desolat label.

Dubfire followed up with a number of releases on some of electronic music's big labels. Richie Hawtin, who signed Dubfire's "Emissions" to his Minus label, also released Dubfire's rework of 'Spastik' (the track that Hawtin produced in 1993 under his Plastikman alias) as an official re-work. Soon thereafter, Sven Vath's Cocoon Records took notice and released some of Dubfire's music as well.

He continued to release more productions. He had two top 10 tracks in Resident Advisor's 100 Most Charted Records of 2007, International DJ Magazine'''s Player of the Year in 2008, nominations for Beatport's "Best Minimal Artist" and "Best Techno Artist" in 2008 and 2009, and mixes for Mixmag, BBC Radio 1's Essential Mix and DJ Magazine.In 2008, Dubfire produced a remix of Radio Slave's "Grindhouse" featuring Danton Eeprom.DJ Magazine called it "jet-black, polished chrome techno".

Dubfire's more recent work has seen him co-produce tracks with British electronic music act Underworld, release a two-disc compilation with Loco Dice for Cocoon, additional remixes of Plastikman material, and a collaborative project with producer Oliver Huntemann.

Discography
Singles/EPs
2007 Emissions - #6 Resident Advisor Top 100 all-time charted tracks
2007 RibCage - #1 Resident Advisor Top 100 all-time charted tracks
2007 Roadkill2007 I Feel Speed2008 Diablo (With Oliver Huntemann)
2008 Dios (With Oliver Huntemann)
2009 Rabid2009 Fuego (With Oliver Huntemann)
2010 Rejekt (Cocoon J)
2012: Slowburn2012: Octvs2012: Debris2014: Exit (featuring Miss Kittin)
2014: Agua (With Oliver Huntemann ft. Xenia Beliayeva)
2022: Algorithm
2022: Rampat
Compilations
2003: GU025 Global Underground: Toronto - Afterclub Mix  - #1 Top Electronic Albums, #20 Independent Albums, #29 Top Heatseekers
2007: GU31 Global Underground: Taipei  - #16 Top Electronic Albums
2009: SCI+TEC: Past / Present / Future2009: Dubfire's Digital Dreams2009: Ten Years Cocoon Ibiza2013: Transmission Remixes
1993: Angela Marni - Slippin' & Slidin'
1994: Watergate - Lonely Winter
2006: Nitzer Ebb - Control I'm Here
2006: Robbie Rivera - Float Away
2007: Axwell Feat. Max'C - I Found U
2007: Meat Katie & D. Ramirez - Stop The Revolution - #99 Resident Advisor Top 100 all-time charted tracks
2007: DJ Yellow - No More Enemy
2007: Plastikman - Spastik - #26 Resident Advisor Top 100 all-time charted tracks
2007: Nic Fanciulli - Lucky Heather
2007: Christian Smith & John Selway - Transit Time
2008: System 7 - Spacebird - #7 Resident Advisor Top 100 all-time charted tracks
2008: UNKLE - Hold My Hand
2008: Radio Slave - Grindhouse
2008: Booka Shade - Charlotte
2008: Gregor Tresher - A Thousand Nights
2008: Minilogue - Jamaica
2008: Paul Ritch - Split the Line
2011: Paperclip People - 4 My Peepz
2011: Davide Squillace, Guti - That Ginger Ponytail
2015: Plastikman - Exposed
2015: Hot Since 82 & Habischmann - Leave Me
2016: Joseph Capriati - Fratello

Awards and nominationsWon for Best Minimal Artist - Beatport Music AwardsWon for Best Techno Artist - Beatport Music AwardsNominated'' for Best Single of 2007 - Emissions - Beatport Music Awards

References

External links

 Dubfire official website
 Sci+Tec Digital Audio official website

Iranian emigrants to the United States
American electronic musicians
American house musicians
Iranian electronic musicians
Musicians from Washington, D.C.
People from Mashhad
American DJs
Iranian DJs
Progressive house musicians
Musicians of Iranian descent
Electronic dance music DJs
1971 births
Living people